{{Infobox artist
| name             = Winslow Homer
| image            = Winslow Homer by Sarony.jpeg
| caption          = Winslow Homer, 1880;photo by Napoleon Sarony (1821–1896)
| birth_name       = Winslow Homer
| birth_date       = 
| birth_place      = Boston, Massachusetts
| death_date       = (aged 74)
| death_place      = Prouts Neck, Maine, US
| known_for        = DrawingWood engravingOil paintingWatercolor painting
| training         = Lithography apprenticeship, 1855–56National Academy of Design (painting), 1863Paris (informal), 1867
| movement         = Realism, American Realism
| notable_works    = Harper's Weekly MagazineBallou's Pictorial MagazineSnap the WhipThe Veteran in a New FieldBreezing Up (A Fair Wind)
| patrons          = 
| awards           = 
}}

Winslow Homer (February 24, 1836 – September 29, 1910) was an American landscape painter and illustrator, best known for his marine subjects. He is considered one of the foremost painters in 19th-century America and a preeminent figure in American art.

Largely self-taught, Homer began his career working as a commercial illustrator. He subsequently took up oil painting and produced major studio works characterized by the weight and density he exploited from the medium. He also worked extensively in watercolor, creating a fluid and prolific oeuvre, primarily chronicling his working vacations.

Early life

Born in Boston, Massachusetts, in 1836, Homer was the second of three sons of Charles Savage Homer and Henrietta Benson Homer, both from long lines of New Englanders. His mother was a gifted amateur watercolorist and Homer's first teacher. She and her son had a close relationship throughout their lives. Homer took on many of her traits, including her quiet, strong-willed, terse, sociable nature; her dry sense of humor; and her artistic talent. Homer had a happy childhood, growing up mostly in then-rural Cambridge, Massachusetts. He was an average student, but his art talent was evident in his early years.

Homer's father was a volatile, restless businessman who was always looking to "make a killing." When Homer was thirteen, Charles gave up the hardware store business to seek a fortune in the California gold rush. When that failed, Charles left his family and went to Europe to raise capital for other get-rich-quick schemes that did not pay off.

After Homer's high school graduation, his father saw a newspaper advertisement and arranged for an apprenticeship. Homer's apprenticeship at the age of 19 to J. H. Bufford, a Boston commercial lithographer, was a formative but "treadmill experience". He worked repetitively on sheet music covers and other commercial work for two years. By 1857, his freelance career was underway after he turned down an offer to join the staff of Harper's Weekly. "From the time I took my nose off that lithographic stone," Homer later stated, "I have had no master, and never shall have any." Homer opened his own studio in Boston.

Homer's career as an illustrator lasted nearly twenty years. He contributed illustrations of Boston life and rural New England life to magazines such as Ballou's Pictorial and Harper's Weekly at a time when the market for illustrations was growing rapidly and fads and fashions were changing quickly. His early works, mostly commercial wood engravings of urban and country social scenes, are characterized by clean outlines, simplified forms, dramatic contrast of light and dark, and lively figure groupings—qualities that remained important throughout his career. His quick success was mostly due to this strong understanding of graphic design and also to the adaptability of his designs to wood engraving.

Before moving to New York in 1859, Homer lived in Belmont, Massachusetts, with his family. His uncle's Belmont mansion, the 1853 Homer House, was the inspiration for a number of his early illustrations and paintings, including several of his 1860s croquet pictures. The Homer House, owned by the Belmont Woman's Club, is open for public tours.

Homer's studio

In 1859, he opened a studio in the Tenth Street Studio Building in New York City, the artistic and publishing capital of the United States. Until 1863, he attended classes at the National Academy of Design, and studied briefly with Frédéric Rondel, who taught him the basics of painting. In only about a year of self-training, Homer was producing excellent oil work. His mother tried to raise family funds to send him to Europe for further study but instead Harper's sent Homer to the front lines of the American Civil War (1861–1865), where he sketched battle scenes and camp life, the quiet moments as well as the chaotic ones. His initial sketches were of the camp, commanders, and army of the famous Union officer, Major General George B. McClellan, at the banks of the Potomac River in October 1861.

Although the drawings did not get much attention at the time, they mark Homer's expanding skills from illustrator to painter. As with his urban scenes, Homer illustrated women during wartime, and showed the effects of the war on the home front. The war work was dangerous and exhausting. Back at his studio, Homer would regain his strength and re-focus his artistic vision. He set to work on a series of war-related paintings based on his sketches, among them Sharpshooter on Picket Duty (1862), Home, Sweet Home (1863), and Prisoners from the Front (1866). He exhibited paintings of these subjects every year at the National Academy of Design from 1863 to 1866. Home, Sweet Home was shown at the National Academy to particular critical acclaim; it was quickly sold and the artist was consequently elected an Associate Academician, then a full Academician in 1865. During this time, he also continued to sell his illustrations to periodicals such as Our Young Folks and Frank Leslie's Chimney Corner.

After the war, Homer turned his attention primarily to scenes of childhood and young women, reflecting nostalgia for simpler times, both his own and the nation as a whole.

Homer was also interested in postwar subject matter that conveyed the silent tension between two communities seeking to understand their future. His oil painting A Visit from the Old Mistress (1876) shows an encounter between a group of four freed slaves and their former mistress. The formal equivalence between the standing figures suggests the balance that the nation hoped to find in the difficult years of Reconstruction. Homer composed this painting from sketches he had made while traveling through Virginia.

Near the beginning of his painting career, the 27-year-old Homer demonstrated a maturity of feeling, depth of perception, and mastery of technique which was immediately recognized. His realism was objective, true to nature, and emotionally controlled. One critic wrote, "Winslow Homer is one of those few young artists who make a decided impression of their power with their very first contributions to the Academy ... He at this moment wields a better pencil, models better, colors better, than many whom, were it not improper, we could mention as regular contributors to the Academy." And of Home, Sweet Home specifically, "There is no clap-trap about it. The delicacy and strength of emotion which reign throughout this little picture are not surpassed in the whole exhibition." "It is a work of real feeling, soldiers in camp listening to the evening band, and thinking of the wives and darlings far away. There is no strained effect in it, no sentimentality, but a hearty, homely actuality, broadly, freely, and simply worked out."

Early landscapes and watercolors

Before exhibiting at the National Academy of Design, Homer finally traveled to Paris, France, in 1867 where he remained for a year. His most praised early painting,Prisoners from the Front, was on exhibit at the Exposition Universelle in Paris at the same time. He did not study formally but he practiced landscape painting while continuing to work for Harper's, depicting scenes of Parisian life.

Homer painted approximately one dozen small paintings during the stay. Although he arrived in France at a time of new fashions in art, Homer's main subject for his paintings was peasant life, showing more of an alignment with the established French Barbizon school and the artist Millet than with newer artists Manet and Courbet. Though his interest in depicting natural light parallels that of the early impressionists, there is no evidence of direct influence as he was already a plein-air painter in America and had already evolved a personal style which was much closer to Manet than Monet. Unfortunately, Homer was very private about his personal life and his methods (even denying his first biographer any personal information or commentary), but his stance was clearly one of independence of style and a devotion to American subjects. As his fellow artist Eugene Benson wrote, Homer believed that artists "should never look at pictures" but should "stutter in a language of their own."

Throughout the 1870s, Homer continued painting mostly rural or idyllic scenes of farm life, children playing, and young adults courting, including Country School (1871) and The Morning Bell (1872). In 1875, Homer quit working as a commercial illustrator and vowed to survive on his paintings and watercolors alone. Despite his excellent critical reputation, his finances continued to remain precarious. His popular 1872 painting Snap the Whip was exhibited at the 1876 Centennial Exposition in Philadelphia, Pennsylvania, as was one of his finest and most famous paintings Breezing Up (1876). Of his work at this time, Henry James wrote:

We frankly confess that we detest his subjects ... he has chosen the least pictorial range of scenery and civilization; he has resolutely treated them as if they were pictorial ... and, to reward his audacity, he has incontestably succeeded.

Many disagreed with James. Breezing Up, Homer's iconic painting of a father and three boys out for a spirited sail, received wide praise. The New York Tribune wrote, "There is no picture in this exhibition, nor can we remember when there has been a picture in any exhibition, that can be named alongside this." Visits to Petersburg, Virginia, around 1876 resulted in paintings of rural African American life. The same straightforward sensibility which allowed Homer to distill art from these potentially sentimental subjects also yielded the most unaffected views of African American life at the time, as illustrated in Dressing for the Carnival (1877) and A Visit from the Old Mistress (1876).

In 1877, Homer exhibited for the first time at the Boston Art Club with the oil painting, An Afternoon Sun, (owned by the Artist). From 1877 through 1909, Homer exhibited often at the Boston Art Club. Works on paper, both drawings and watercolors, were frequently exhibited by Homer beginning in 1882. A most unusual sculpture by the Artist, Hunter with Dog – Northwoods, was exhibited in 1902. By that year, Homer had switched his primary Gallery from the Boston-based Doll and Richards to the New York City based Knoedler & Co.

Homer became a member of The Tile Club, a group of artists and writers who met frequently to exchange ideas and organize outings for painting, as well as foster the creation of decorative tiles. For a short time, he designed tiles for fireplaces.

Homer's nickname in The Tile Club was "The Obtuse Bard". Other well known Tilers were painters William Merritt Chase, Arthur Quartley, and the sculptor Augustus Saint Gaudens.

Homer started painting with watercolors on a regular basis in 1873 during a summer stay in Gloucester, Massachusetts. From the beginning, his technique was natural, fluid and confident, demonstrating his innate talent for a difficult medium. His impact would be revolutionary. Here, again, the critics were puzzled at first, "A child with an ink bottle could not have done worse." Another critic said that Homer "made a sudden and desperate plunge into water color painting". But his watercolors proved popular and enduring, and sold more readily, improving his financial condition considerably. They varied from highly detailed (Blackboard – 1877) to broadly impressionistic (Schooner at Sunset – 1880). Some watercolors were made as preparatory sketches for oil paintings (as for "Breezing Up") and some as finished works in themselves. Thereafter, he seldom traveled without paper, brushes and water based paints.

As a result of disappointments with women or from some other emotional turmoil, Homer became reclusive in the late 1870s, no longer enjoying urban social life and living instead in Gloucester. For a while, he even lived in secluded Eastern Point Lighthouse (with the keeper's family). In re-establishing his love of the sea, Homer found a rich source of themes while closely observing the fishermen, the sea, and the marine weather. After 1880, he rarely featured genteel women at leisure, focusing instead on working women.

Life in the United Kingdom

Homer spent two years (1881–1882) in the coastal village of Cullercoats, Northumberland. Many of the paintings at Cullercoats took as their subjects working men and women and their daily heroism, imbued with a solidity and sobriety which was new to Homer's art, presaging the direction of his future work. He wrote, "The women are the working bees. Stout hardy creatures." His works from this period are almost exclusively watercolors. His palette became constrained and sober; his paintings larger, more ambitious, and more deliberately conceived and executed. His subjects more universal and less nationalistic, more heroic by virtue of his unsentimental rendering. Although he moved away from the spontaneity and bright innocence of the American paintings of the 1860s and 1870s, Homer found a new style and vision which carried his talent into new realms.

Maine and maturity

Back in the U.S. in November 1882, Homer showed his English watercolors in New York. Critics noticed the change in style at once, "He is a very different Homer from the one we knew in days gone by", now his pictures "touch a far higher plane ... They are works of High Art." Homer's women were no longer "dolls who flaunt their millinery" but "sturdy, fearless, fit wives and mothers of men" who are fully capable of enduring the forces and vagaries of nature alongside their men.

In 1883, Homer moved to Prouts Neck, Maine (in Scarborough), and lived at his family's estate in the remodeled carriage house seventy-five feet from the ocean. During the rest of the mid-1880s, Homer painted his monumental sea scenes. In Undertow (1886), depicting the dramatic rescue of two female bathers by two male lifeguards, Homer's figures "have the weight and authority of classical figures". In Eight Bells (1886), two sailors carefully take their bearings on deck, calmly appraising their position and by extension, their relationship with the sea; they are confident in their seamanship but respectful of the forces before them. Other notable paintings among these dramatic struggle-with-nature images are Banks Fisherman, The Gulf Stream, Rum Cay, Mending the Nets, and Searchlight on Harbor Entrance, Santiago de Cuba. Some of these he repeated as etchings.

At fifty years of age, Homer had become a "Yankee Robinson Crusoe, cloistered on his art island" and "a hermit with a brush". These paintings established Homer, as the New York Evening Post wrote, "in a place by himself as the most original and one of the strongest of American painters." But despite his critical recognition, Homer's work never achieved the popularity of traditional Salon pictures or of the flattering portraits by John Singer Sargent. Many of the sea pictures took years to sell and Undertow only earned him $400.

In these years, Homer received emotional sustenance primarily from his mother, brother Charles, and sister-in-law Martha ("Mattie"). After his mother's death, Homer became a "parent" for his aging but domineering father and Mattie became his closest female intimate. In the winters of 1884–5, Homer ventured to warmer locations in Florida, Cuba, and the Bahamas and did a series of watercolors as part of a commission for Century Magazine. He replaced the turbulent green storm-tossed sea of Prouts Neck with the sparkling blue skies of the Caribbean and the hardy New Englanders with Black natives, further expanding his watercolor technique, subject matter, and palette. During this trip he painted Children Under a Palm Tree for Edith Blake, the wife of Henry Arthur Blake, the then-governor of The Bahamas. His tropical stays inspired and refreshed him in much the same way as Paul Gauguin's trips to Tahiti.Children Under a Palm Tree was re-discovered on an episode of Antiques Roadshow in 2008, and was formally attributed to Homer on BBC's television series Fake or Fortune? by Philip Mould and Fiona Bruce. Ownership of the painting remains an on-going controversy.A Garden in Nassau (1885) is one of the best examples of these watercolors. Once again, his freshness and originality were praised by critics but proved too advanced for the traditional art buyers and he "looked in vain for profits". Homer lived frugally, however, and fortunately his affluent brother Charles provided financial help when needed.

Homer frequently visited Key West, Florida, between 1888 and 1903. Some of his best-known works, A Norther, Key West, The Gulf Stream, Taking on Wet Provisions, and Palms in the Storm, are said to have been produced there.

Homer found inspiration in summer trips to the North Woods Club, near the hamlet of Minerva, New York, in the Adirondack Mountains. It was on these fishing vacations that he experimented with the watercolor medium, producing works of the utmost vigor and subtlety, hymns to solitude, nature, and to outdoor life. Homer does not shrink from the savagery of blood sports nor the struggle for survival. The color effects are boldly and facilely applied. In terms of quality and invention, Homer's achievements as a watercolorist are unparalleled: "Homer had used his singular vision and manner of painting to create a body of work that has not been matched."

In 1893, Homer painted one of his most famous "Darwinian" works, The Fox Hunt, which depicts a flock of starving crows descending on a fox slowed by deep snow. This was Homer's largest painting, and it was immediately purchased by the Pennsylvania Academy of the Fine Arts, his first painting in a major American museum collection. In Huntsman and Dogs (1891), a lone, impassive hunter, with his yelping dogs at his side, heads home after a hunt with deer skins slung over his right shoulder. Another late work, The Gulf Stream (1899), shows a black sailor adrift in a damaged boat, surrounded by sharks and an impending maelstrom.

By 1900, Homer finally reached financial stability, as his paintings fetched good prices from museums and he began to receive rents from real estate properties. He also became free of the responsibilities of caring for his father, who had died two years earlier. Homer continued producing excellent watercolors, mostly on trips to Canada and the Caribbean. Other late works include sporting scenes such as Right and Left, as well as seascapes absent of human figures, mostly of waves crashing against rocks in varying light. His late seascapes are especially valued for their dramatic and forceful expression of nature's powers, and for their beauty and intensity.

In his last decade, he at times followed the advice he had given a student artist in 1907: "Leave rocks for your old age—they're easy."

Homer died in 1910 at the age of 74 in his Prouts Neck studio and was interred in the Mount Auburn Cemetery in Cambridge, Massachusetts. His painting, Shooting the Rapids, Saguenay River, remains unfinished.

His Prouts Neck studio, a National Historic Landmark, is now owned by the Portland Museum of Art, which offers tours.

Influence

Homer never taught in a school or privately, as did Thomas Eakins, but his works strongly influenced succeeding generations of American painters for their direct and energetic interpretation of man's stoic relationship to an often neutral and sometimes harsh wilderness. Robert Henri called Homer's work an "integrity of nature".

American illustrator and teacher Howard Pyle revered Homer and encouraged his students to study him. His student and fellow illustrator, N. C. Wyeth (and through him Andrew Wyeth and Jamie Wyeth), shared the influence and appreciation, even following Homer to Maine for inspiration. The elder Wyeth's respect for his antecedent was "intense and absolute" and can be observed in his early work Mowing (1907). Perhaps Homer's austere individualism is best captured in his admonition to artists: "Look at nature, work independently, and solve your own problems."

U.S. stamp

In 1962, the U.S. Post Office released a commemorative stamp honoring Winslow Homer. Homer's famous oil painting Breezing Up, now hanging in the National Gallery in Washington DC, was chosen as the image for the design of this issue. On August 12, 2010, The Postal Service issued a 44-cent commemorative stamp featuring Homer's Boys in a Pasture at the APS Stamp Show in Richmond, Virginia.

This stamp was the ninth to be issued in a series entitled "American Treasures". The original painting is part of the Hayden Collection at the Museum of Fine Arts in Boston. It depicts two boys from Belmont, Massachusetts—John Carney and Patrick Keenan—who posed for the artist for 75 cents per day.

Works
His work was part of the painting event in the art competition at the 1932 Summer Olympics. Unlike many artists who were well known for working in only one art medium, Winslow Homer was prominent in a variety of art media, as in the following examples:

Pastoral landscapes and lifestyle (see pastoralism) is a genre of literature, art and music that depicts shepherds herding livestock around open areas of land according to seasons and the changing availability of water and pasturage. A pastoral is a work of this genre.

Winslow Homer's paintings often depicted marine landscapes. Later, when Winslow Homer spent the years between 1881 and 1882 in the village of Cullercoats, Tyne and Wear, his paintings depicting shores and coastal landscapes changed. Many of the paintings from the English coast have as subjects working men and women from the area.

References

Further reading
 Athens, Elizabeth; Ruud, Brandon; Tedeschi, Martha, Coming Away: Winslow Homer & England. Worcester, Massachusetts: Worcester Art Museum; Milwaukee, Wisconsin: Milwaukee Art Museum; New Haven, Connecticut: in association with Yale University Press, 2017.  
 Byrd, Dana E.; Goodyear III, Frank H., Winslow Homer and the Camera: Photography and the Art of Painting. Brunswick, Maine: Bowdoin College Museum of Art; New Haven, Connecticut, in association with Yale University Press, 2018.  
 Cross, William R., Winslow Homer: American Passage. New York: Farrar, Straus and Giroux, 2022. 
 Griffin, Randall C., Winslow Homer: An American Vision. London: Phaidon Press, 2017. 
 Grossman, Julian, Echo of a Distant Drum: Winslow Homer and the Civil War. New York: H. N. Abrams, 1974. . Reissued as The Civil War: Battlefields and Campgrounds in the Art of Winslow Homer. Abradale Press/H. N. Abrams, 1991. 
 Herdrich, Stephanie L. and Sylvia Yount, Winslow Homer: Crosscurrents. The Metropolitan Museum of Art, Yale University Press, 2022. Exhibition Catalog
 Malcolm, John, Simpson's Homer, 2001 and 2006. This art mystery novel, the only novel to feature Winslow Homer, involves Tim Simpson tracking down an unknown watercolour by Homer of Cullercoats in 1881. 
 Murphy, Alexandra R., Winslow Homer in the Clark Collection. Williamstown, Mass: Sterling and Francine Clark Art Institute, 1986. 
 Sherman, Frederic Fairchild, American Painters of Yesterday and Today, 1919, Priv. print in New York. Chapter: Early Paintings by Winslow Homer 
 Wood, Peter H. and Dalton, Karen C. C., Winslow Homer's Images of Blacks: The Civil War and Reconstruction Years. Austin: University of Texas Press, 1988. 
 Wood, Peter H., Weathering the Storm: Inside Winslow Homer's Gulf Stream. Athens, Georgia: University of Georgia Press, 2004. 
 Wood, Peter H., Near Andersonville: Winslow Homer's Civil War. Cambridge, Massachusetts, and London, UK: Harvard University Press, 2010. 

External links

 Analysis of 126 Famous Paintings by Winslow Homer
Wood, Peter H. "Winslow Homer and the American Civil War". A lecture on Homer's painting Near Andersonville and his relationship to the Civil War. Southern Spaces'', March 4, 2011.
 Analysis of 125 Famous Winslow Homer Paintings
 Winslow-Homer.com
 Winslow Homer Artwork Examples on AskART.
 "Winslow Homer: Making Art, Making History". Exhibition held at the Sterling and Francine Clark Art Institute in 2005. The exhibition website showcases the range of Homer's work—oil paintings, watercolors, drawings and etchings, as well as approximately 120 wood engravings and other reproductions from the Clark's collections.
 Winslow Homer at the Clark: a series of videos produced by the Sterling and Francine Clark Art Institute that explore the themes, contexts and techniques of Winslow Homer works in the Clark collection.
 Winslow Homer biography, Metropolitan Museum of Art.
 Winslow Homer Gallery at MuseumSyndicate
 Philip C. Beam papers, c. 1946– c. 1993; Homer historian and his related collection from the Smithsonian Archives of American Art.
 Winslow Homer collection at the Cooper-Hewitt, National Design Museum

1836 births
1910 deaths
Landscape artists
Art Students League of New York alumni
Artists from Boston
Gilded Age
People from Scarborough, Maine
Realist painters
American marine artists
American watercolorists
Burials at Mount Auburn Cemetery
19th-century American painters
American male painters
20th-century American painters
20th-century American printmakers
American landscape painters
Painters from Florida
History of Key West, Florida
Olympic competitors in art competitions
People from Cullercoats
Members of the American Academy of Arts and Letters